The Tatra T6 is a family of trams from the Czech manufacturer Tatra ČKD built in Prague. It was a continuation of the Tatra T5 type.

The cars had an all-steel welded construction with large side windows and a high ceiling. From the factory they were equipped with semi-automatic ESW couplers, which allowed two cars to run with the electric current being drawn through a single collector. The interior walls and ceiling were covered with plasterboard and hardboard, and the driver's cab was served by a sliding door and a large instrument panel.

Tatra trams
Tram vehicles of the Czech Republic